Vencer la ausencia (English: Overcoming Loss) is a Mexican telenovela that aired on Las Estrellas from 18 July 2022 to 4 November 2022. The series is produced by Rosy Ocampo and is the fourth production of the "Vencer" franchise. It stars Ariadne Díaz, Mayrín Villanueva, Alejandra Barros, and María Perroni Garza.

Plot 
The sisterhood of four women of different origins is shattered when an accident causes them all to lose a loved one. After discovering the causes of the accident, they will share a painful mystery. The four women must overcome the absence of their loved ones and resolve the grief to rebuild their lives, regaining the sisterhood that united them.

Cast 
 Ariadne Díaz as Julia Miranda
 Mayrín Villanueva as Esther Noriega
 David Zepeda as Jerónimo Garrido
 Danilo Carrera as Ángel Funes
 Alejandra Barros as Celeste Machado
 Alexis Ayala as Braulio Dueñas
 Jesús Ochoa as Rodolfo Miranda
 Mariana Garza as Margarita Rojo
 María Perroni Garza as Rayo Rojo
 Nailea Norvind as Flavia Vilchis
 Laura Carmine as Lenar Ramírez
 Mariluz Bermúdez as Ana Sofi Ordax
 David Ostrosky as Homero Funes 
 Silvia Mariscal as Claudia Luna
 Laura Luz as Chepina Chávez
 Felipe Najera as Máximo Camargo
 Eugenio Montessoro as Santino
 Agustín Arana as Donato Gil
 Marcos Montero as Misael Valdéz
 Fernanda Urdapilleta as Gina Miranda
 Adriana Llabrés as Mirna Funes
 Miguel Martínez as Erik
 Andrés Vázquez as Iván Camargo
 Ándre Sebastián as Child Iván
 Federico Porras as Adair
 Daney Mendoza as Ebenezer
 Nicole Reyes as Matilde
 Luca Valentini as Teo
 Mariano Soria as Daniel
 Rodrigo Murray as Homero Funes

Recurring 
 José Remis as Sammy
 Arath Aquino as El Robin

Guest stars 
 Angelique Boyer as Renata Sánchez Vidal
 Paulina Goto as Marcela Dúran

Production 
The telenovela was announced on 1 November 2021. Production began in April 2022.

Ratings 
 
}}

Episodes

Notes

References

External links 
 

2022 telenovelas
2022 Mexican television series debuts
2022 Mexican television series endings
2020s Mexican television series
Televisa telenovelas
Mexican telenovelas
Spanish-language telenovelas